Peter Maynard (born 28 June 1960) is a former Australian rules footballer who played with Melbourne in the Victorian Football League (VFL). He is better known for playing with SANFL side the Glenelg Tigers for a decade from 1982 - 1990, where he utilised blistering pace & stellar goal kicking accuracy on the run to influence games in his team’s favour, including the Tigers’ drought breaking 1985 premiership against North Adelaide & the back to back 1986 premiership the following year, also against North Adelaide.

Maynard then spent one season in 1991 with the West Torrens Eagles (now known as Woodville - West Torrens). He later became the team runner for the Adelaide Crows & is the father of current Collingwood player Brayden Maynard & former Demons player Corey Maynard.

Notes

External links 		
		
		
		
		
		
		
1960 births
Living people
Australian rules footballers from Victoria (Australia)		
Melbourne Football Club players
Shepparton Football Club players